Ali-Asghar Sherdost (born in 1962) is an Iranian writer, diplomat and politician.

Sherdost was born in Tabriz, East Azerbaijan. He is a member of the 2000 Islamic Consultative Assembly from the electorate of Tabriz and former Ambassador of Iran to Tajikistan.

References

Notes
 
 

Iranian diplomats
Deputies of Tabriz, Osku and Azarshahr
People from Tabriz
University of Tabriz alumni
University of Tehran alumni
Ambassadors of Iran to Tajikistan
1962 births
Living people
Azerbaijani-language writers
Members of the 6th Islamic Consultative Assembly
Members of the Tajik Academy of Sciences